Camil Petrescu (9/21 April 1894 – 14 May 1957) was a Romanian playwright, novelist, philosopher and poet. He marked the end of the traditional novel era and laid the foundation of the modern novel era in Romania.

Life 
Petrescu was born in Bucharest in 1894. He lost both his parents early in life and was raised by a relative, or a nanny from the Moșilor suburb (the sources remain quite unclear on this).

Petrescu went to primary school at Obor, and to high school at Saint Sava National College, where he wrote his very first poem. Being very poor, he studied assiduously, worked to support himself, and relatively late—at the age of 29—he began his studies in philosophy at the University of Bucharest. His antisemitism is controversial, having Jewish friends such as Mihail Sebastian.

In 1916, Petrescu was drafted and sent to the battlefields of then raging World War I, where he was wounded and taken prisoner by the Austro-Hungarians. Freed in 1918, he depicted his war experiences in his 1930 novel  ("Last Night of Love, First Night of War"). In 1933, Petrescu wrote the novel  ("The Bed of Procrustes"). He was a teacher in Timișoara, and director of the National Theater Bucharest. He was elected titular member of the Romanian Academy in 1948. He died in 1957 in Bucharest, and was buried at the city's Bellu Cemetery.

Works 
Ultima noapte de dragoste, întâia noapte de război ("Last Night of Love, First Night of War"), 1930
Patul lui Procust ("The Bed of Procrustes"), 1933, of which we now have Ileana Orlich's translation of 2008, published by the Camil Petrescu Cultural Foundation in Bucharest)
Doctrina substanței ("The Doctrine of Substance"), 1940

Filmography 
 Patul lui Procust (2001) – Bed of Procust, or Procust's Bed (International English title; the original Romanian title refers to the mythical Procrustes)
 Cei care plătesc cu viața (1991) aka Those Who Pay With Their Lives (1991)
 Mitică Popescu (1984) (play)
 Iată femeia pe care o iubesc (1981) (TV) (play)
 Ultima noapte de dragoste (1979) (novel Ultima noapte de dragoste, întîia noapte de război) - Last Night of Love, First Night Of War (1979)

References 

Romanian male novelists
Romanian dramatists and playwrights
Romanian theatre critics
Titular members of the Romanian Academy
Chairpersons of the National Theatre Bucharest
Romanian military personnel of World War I
World War I prisoners of war held by Austria-Hungary
Romanian prisoners of war
Saint Sava National College alumni
University of Bucharest alumni
Writers from Bucharest
Burials at Bellu Cemetery
1894 births
1957 deaths
Male dramatists and playwrights
20th-century Romanian novelists
20th-century Romanian dramatists and playwrights
20th-century Romanian male writers
20th-century Romanian philosophers